Sorpe is a river of Hochsauerlandkreis, North Rhine-Westphalia, western Germany. It is a left (western) tributary of the Röhr, which is a tributary of the Ruhr, a tributary of the Rhine.

The Sorpe Dam is located on the Sorpe forming the Sorpe Reservoir. It is located near the small town of Sundern.

See also
List of rivers of North Rhine-Westphalia

References

Rivers of North Rhine-Westphalia
Hochsauerlandkreis
Rivers of Germany